The 2016 Missouri Valley Conference men's soccer tournament was the 26th edition of the tournament. It determined the Missouri Valley Conference's (MVC) automatic berth in the 2016 NCAA Division I Men's Soccer Championship. Missouri State University hosted the tournament at Betty & Bobby Allison South Stadium on the Missouri State campus in Springfield, Missouri on November 8, 9, 11 &13, 2016.

The second-seeded SIUE Cougars won the tournament, beating the fifth-seeded Missouri State Bears 1–0  in the championship match. It was SIUE's second MVC championship.

Qualification 

In a departure from the past, all seven teams in the Missouri Valley Conference qualified for the tournament with seeding based on their conference regular season records.  The two top-seeded teams received first round byes, and the two bottom-seeded teams met in a play-in game.

Bracket

Television/internet coverage 
All games will be streamed live on The Valley on ESPN3.

Schedule

Statistics

2016 MVC Men's Soccer All-Tournament team 
2016 Missouri Valley Conference Men's Soccer Tournament MVP— Austin Ledbetter, SIUE
 Richard Olson, Bradley
 Wes Carson, Central Arkansas
 Mueng Sunday, Drake
 Ian McGrath, Evansville
 Zac Blaydes, Evansville
 Ryan Howe, Loyola
 Kevin Engesser, Loyola
 Rob Oslica, Missouri State
 Jake Buckle, Missouri State
 Emmerich Hoegg, Missouri State
 Kyle Dal Santo, SIUE
 Devyn Jambga, SIUE
 Keegan McHugh, SIUE

See also 
 Missouri Valley Conference
 2016 Missouri Valley Conference men's soccer season
 2016 NCAA Division I men's soccer season
 2016 NCAA Division I Men's Soccer Championship

References 

2016